Kirimi Dam  is a gravity dam located in Kochi Prefecture in Japan. The dam is used for flood control. The catchment area of the dam is 49.1 km2. The dam impounds about 40  ha of land when full and can store 8160 thousand cubic meters of water. The construction of the dam was started on 1969 and completed in 1988.

See also
List of dams in Japan

References

Dams in Kōchi Prefecture